A gablefront house, also known as a gable front house or front gable house, is a vernacular (or "folk") house type in which the gable is facing the street or entrance side of the house. They were built in large numbers throughout the United States primarily between the early 19th century and 1920. A gablefront cottage is a smaller variant, consisting of either a single story or a story-and-a-half. They were typically used as working-class dwellings, most being rather simple in design. However, they may contain some ornamentation such as brackets around the doorways or roof line. Many gablefront houses contain front porches.

History
The gablefront house developed after 1825 and coincided with the popularity of the Greek Revival style, which placed emphasis on the gable-end of the house in the form of a pediment; often associated with Greek temples.

The gablefront house allows the narrow part of the house to face the street, usually on a rectangular lot. The gablefront house became a uniquely American folk house type. The gablefront house cropped up in styles ranging from Greek Revival, to Gothic Revival, to Queen Anne, to a simpler vernacular style home. The gablefront house form remained popular into the early 20th century.

Variants

Gabled ell
One variation of the gablefront house is the gabled ell. The gabled ell incorporated a side gable, which was typically added-on to the house. The add-on was usually in order to obtain additional space, light and cross-ventilation.

T-plan
Another variation of this house form is the T-plan house. The T-plan house consists of gable-ends on either side of the front-facing main gable.

See also
List of house types
List of house styles
Upright and Wing

References

External links
Martinsville, Indiana site

House styles
American architectural styles